Landshut Castle may refer to:
 Landshut Castle, Switzerland, a castle in Utzenstorf, Switzerland
 Landshut Castle, Germany, a ruin above the town of Bernkastel-Kues, Germany